A statue of Alexander Hamilton by William Rimmer is installed along Commonwealth Avenue, between Arlington and Berkeley Streets, in Boston, Massachusetts, United States.

Description
The 1864–1865 granite statue measures approximately 10 ft. x 3 ft. 4 in. x 3 ft. 4 in., and rests on a granite base measuring 8 ft. 5 in. x 5 ft. 4 in. x 5 ft. 4 in. The base has three relief portrait busts depicting Hamilton, John Jay, and George Washington.

History
The artwork was surveyed by the Smithsonian Institution's "Save Outdoor Sculpture!" program in 1993.

Reception
The statue was widely regarded as a failure by nineteenth-century commentators. The critic George B. Woods stated that Hamilton appeared to be "swathed like an infant or a mummy." William H. Downes wrote that it "suggested a snow image which had partly melted." Lincoln Kirstein, writing in 1961, offered a more favorable assessment, commenting that "the mass and its drapery are powerfully suggestive, anticipating Rodin's Balzac in the looming treatment of the rising form."

References

External links

 

1865 sculptures
Statues of Alexander Hamilton
George Washington in art
Granite sculptures in Massachusetts
John Jay
Monuments and memorials in Boston
Outdoor sculptures in Boston
Sculptures of men in Massachusetts
Statues in Boston